The St Albans-class ships of the line were a class of three 64-gun third rates, designed for the Royal Navy by Sir Thomas Slade.

Design
Slade based the St Albans draught on that of his earlier 74-gun .

Ships

Builder: Perry, Blackwall Yard, London
Ordered: 13 January 1761
Launched: 12 September 1764
Fate: Broken up, 1814

Builder: Wells and Stanton, Rotherhithe
Ordered: 13 January 1761
Launched: 24 October 1763
Fate: Burned, 1777

Builder: Clevely, Gravesend
Ordered: 2 August 1780
Launched: 9 March 1784
Fate: Broken up, 1801

References

Lavery, Brian (2003) The Ship of the Line – Volume 1: The development of the battlefleet 1650–1850. Conway Maritime Press. .

 
Ship of the line classes